Matic Seferović (born 22 December 1986) is a football midfielder from Slovenia. He plays for Radomlje.

References

External links
PrvaLiga profile 
Nogomania profile 

1986 births
Living people
Slovenian footballers
Footballers from Ljubljana
Association football midfielders
NK Ivančna Gorica players
NK Domžale players